Microtechnites is a genus of plant bugs in the family Miridae. There are about six described species in Microtechnites.

Species
These six species belong to the genus Microtechnites:
 Microtechnites altigena (Carvalho and Carpintero, 1986) c g
 Microtechnites bractatus (Say, 1832) c g b (garden fleahopper)
 Microtechnites canus (Distant, 1893) c g
 Microtechnites chrysolepis (Kirkaldy, 1904) c g
 Microtechnites inesalti (Carvalho and Carpintero, 1992) c g
 Microtechnites spegazzinii (Berg, 1883) c g
Data sources: i = ITIS, c = Catalogue of Life, g = GBIF, b = Bugguide.net

References

Further reading

External links

 

Miridae genera